Out Among the Stars is the forty-second studio album by American recording artist Merle Haggard released on Epic Records in 1986. It reached number 15 on the Billboard country albums chart. It contains the song "My Life's Been Grand," which Merle wrote with Gordon Terry of The Strangers.

Background
Out Among the Stars features a plethora of producers and more of Haggard's increasingly sentimental and mellow sound. Aside from the Dixie blues of "Pennies from Heaven," the album is dominated by romantic and tearful ballads adorned with the smooth keyboards and processed guitars that were typical of Nashville recording at the time. The album was the result of songs consisting of left-over tracks from his days with MCA Records which were bought out by Epic and the reason many of the songs have a dated sound. The only newly recorded tracks appearing here are "Out Among The Stars", "The Show's Almost Over", and "Almost Persuaded". The single "Out Among the Stars" failed to crack the Top 20 and a second single, "Almost Persuaded" (produced by Billy Sherrill, who also co-wrote the tune) peaked at number 58.

Critical reception

Eugene Chadbourne of AllMusic derides the album, writing that what Haggard does emotionally with his lyrics "is so ripe with sentimentality that with the wrong kind of production it can quickly evolve into just plain rotten," and calls the album's title track "just overblown, a potboiler on the level of the worst Bruce Springsteen material." In his book The Running Kind, biographer David Cantwell classifies the LP as one of Haggard's "never great, but always solid" eighties albums.

Track listing
"Out Among the Stars" (Adam Mitchell) – 4:27
"My Life's Been Grand" (Merle Haggard, Gordon Terry) – 2:30
"Love Keeps Hanging On" (Haggard) – 2:32
"Why Can't I Cry" (Haggard) – 5:00
"Love Don't Hurt Every Time (Haggard) – 2:29
"Pennies from Heaven" (Johnny Burke, Arthur Johnston) – 4:15
"Tell Me Something Bad About Tulsa" (Red Lane) – 3:15
"The Show's Almost Over" (Chuck Howard) – 3:56
"Bleachers" (Haggard) – 3:21
"Susie" (Haggard) – 2:24
"Almost Persuaded" (Billy Sherrill, Glenn Sutton) – 3:12

References

1986 albums
Merle Haggard albums
Epic Records albums
Albums produced by Billy Sherrill
Albums produced by Ray Baker (music producer)